Li Guobang (born 1951) is a Chinese diplomat. He was born in Inner Mongolia. He was Ambassador of the People's Republic of China to Croatia (1997–2000), Ukraine (2000–2003), Serbia and Montenegro (2003–2006), Serbia (2006–2008) and Cyprus (2009–2012).

References

1951 births
Living people
Ambassadors of China to Croatia
Ambassadors of China to Ukraine
Ambassadors of China to Serbia
Ambassadors of China to Cyprus
People from Tongliao